102 Nekkilady  is a village in the southern state of Karnataka, India. It is located in the Kadaba taluk of Dakshina Kannada district.

See also
 Dakshina Kannada
 Districts of Karnataka

References

Villages in Dakshina Kannada district